Keishawn Bierra (born July 26, 1995) is an American football linebacker who is currently a member of the Montreal Alouettes of the Canadian Football League (CFL). He played college football at Washington. In the NFL Bierria has been a member of the Denver Broncos, Jacksonville Jaguars, and Arizona Cardinals. In the CFL he has also been a member of the Edmonton Elks and Saskatchewan Roughriders.

College career 
Bierria played college football for the Washington Huskies. In his junior season he had five fumble recoveries in 2016, leading the Football Bowl Subdivision. Bierra had 60 tackles (four for loss), two forced fumbles, and two fumble recoveries in 2017. He was named Second-team All-Pac-12 for the 2016 and 2017 seasons. He finished his four-year collegiate career having played in 54 games for the Huskies, contributing with 242 tackles, 19.5 tackles for loss, eight fumble recoveries, 7.5 sacks, five forced fumbles and four passes defensed.

Professional career

Denver Broncos
Bierria was drafted by the Denver Broncos in the sixth round (217th overall) of the 2018 NFL Draft. On October 1, 2019, Bierria was waived by the Broncos.

Jacksonville Jaguars
On October 29, 2019, Bierria was signed to the Jacksonville Jaguars practice squad.

Arizona Cardinals
On December 18, 2019, Bierria was signed by the Arizona Cardinals off the Jaguars practice squad. On April 30, 2020, Bierria was released by the Cardinals.

Edmonton Elks
On February 25, 2021, Bierria was signed by the Edmonton Elks of the Canadian Football League. In his first season in the CFL he played in 13 regular season games and contributed with 50 defensive tackles, two quarterback sacks and one interception. Bierria was released by the Elks on the first day of free agency, February 9, 2022.

Saskatchewan Roughriders 
Bierria signed with the Saskatchewan Roughriders on June 27, 2022. He was released by the Riders on July 30, 2022. He played in two games for the Riders during the 2022 season.

Montreal Alouettes 
Bierria joined his third CFL team in the span of a few months when he signed a contract with the Montreal Alouettes on August 7, 2022.

References

1995 births
Living people
American football linebackers
Arizona Cardinals players
Denver Broncos players
Edmonton Elks players
Jacksonville Jaguars players
People from Carson, California
Players of American football from California
Sportspeople from Los Angeles County, California
Washington Huskies football players